Marcel Bonnot (born 24 May 1946 in Rémondans-Vaivre) was a member of the National Assembly of France.  He represented Doubs's 3rd constituency
from 2002 to 2017 as a member of the Union for a Popular Movement.

References

1946 births
Living people
People from Doubs
Rally for the Republic politicians
Union for a Popular Movement politicians
Gaullism, a way forward for France
Deputies of the 12th National Assembly of the French Fifth Republic
Deputies of the 13th National Assembly of the French Fifth Republic
Deputies of the 14th National Assembly of the French Fifth Republic